Charles Newton may refer to:
 Charles Newton (actor) (1874–1926), American silent film actor
 Charles Newton (inventor) (1870–1932), American firearm designer and inventor
 C. M. Newton (1930–2018), American basketball coach
 Charles D. Newton (1861–1930), NY State Attorney General, 1919–1922
 Sir Charles Thomas Newton (1816–1894), British archaeologist
 Charles Newton (American football) (1916–1994), American football back